Tay Chin Joo (born 12 May 1955) is a Singaporean former national swimmer. She competed in the women's 100 metre butterfly at the 1972 Summer Olympics.

Early life and education 
Tay was born on 12 May 1955 at Kandang Kerbau Hospital in Singapore. She stayed for a period in Kuala Lumpur, Malaysia with her family when she was young. Tay studied at Methodist Girls' School from 1962 to1971 and then at Anglo-Chinese School for pre-university education. Tay graduated with a Bachelor of Science degree (summa cum laude ) from Arizona State  University  &  subsequently attended the University of California, Los Angeles, where she obtained her Masters in Business Administration, majoring in Finance.

Swimming career 
Tay learned to swim when her family was living in Kuala Lumpur, Malaysia. When Tay was six years old, she started competing in diving and swimming competitions with her brother and sisters at the Royal Selangor Golf Club.

At 10 years old, Tay represented Singapore at the 1965 Southeast Asian Peninsular Games (SEAP Games) held at Kuala Lumpur, Malaysia where she is part of the women's 4x100m Freestyle Relay team. The team won gold at the event and Tay became the youngest athlete to win a gold medal in swimming at the SEAP Games.

Tay won the bronze medal in the 4x100m Freestyle Relay event at the 1966 Asian Games.

At the 1967 SEAP Games, Tay took two gold medals in the 4x100m Freestyle Relay and 4x100m Medley Relay events, two silver medals in the 100m and 200m butterfly events where she lost both events to Pat Chan and one bronze medal in the 200m individual medley event.

At the 1969 SEAP Games, Tay improved her medal showing with two gold medals at the 4x100m Freestyle Relay and 4x100m Medley Relay events, four silver medals in the 100m and 200m butterfly events losing to Chan again, 100m freestyle event and 200m individual medley event.

In 1970, at her second Asian Games at Bangkok, Thailand, Tay won two silver medals at the 4x100m Freestyle Relay and 4x100m Medley Relay events and a bronze medal at the 100m butterfly event.

Tay participated at her first British Commonwealth Games in 1970 where she failed to qualify from the heats of the 100m and 200m butterfly events. She was also part of the team in the 4x100m Medley Relay event which finished 7th.

At her last SEAP games outing in 1971, Tay had her best results with four gold medals at the 100m and 200m butterfly events, 4x100m Freestyle Relay and 4x100m Medley Relay events and a silver medal at the 200m individual medley event.

Tay also represent Singapore at the 1971 Hapoel Games.

In 1972, Tay was the only Singaporean swimmer to qualify for the 100 meters butterfly event at the 1972 Munich Olympics. She failed to qualify from her heat.

At the 1974 Asian Games, Tay won a silver medal at the 4x100m Freestyle Relay event and two bronze medals at the and 4x100m Medley Relay and 100m butterfly events.

Post swimming career 
Tay was a member of the SSA Legacy Council, which was established in 2015 to highlight and showcase the aquatic fraternity's achievements. 

Tay was Vice President (Synchronised Swimming) at the Singapore Swimming Association for 8 years. Her story of bringing the national synchronised swimming team was told in an interview for the illustrated reference book "Great Lengths: Singapore's Swimming Pools".

Personal life 
Tay has three siblings who are also national athletes for Singapore; Tay Boon Tiong Wilson (swimming and water polo), Tay Chin Hong Nora (springboard diving), Tay Chin Say Molly (swimming).

Awards 
Tay was named Singapore's Sportswoman of the Year in 1973, and received the Individual Meritorious Award in 1971 and 1972.

References

External links
 

1955 births
Living people
Singaporean female butterfly swimmers
Singaporean female freestyle swimmers
Singaporean female medley swimmers
Olympic swimmers of Singapore
Swimmers at the 1972 Summer Olympics
Commonwealth Games competitors for Singapore
Swimmers at the 1970 British Commonwealth Games
Place of birth missing (living people)
Asian Games medalists in swimming
Asian Games silver medalists for Singapore
Asian Games bronze medalists for Singapore
Swimmers at the 1966 Asian Games
Swimmers at the 1970 Asian Games
Swimmers at the 1974 Asian Games
Medalists at the 1966 Asian Games
Medalists at the 1970 Asian Games
Medalists at the 1974 Asian Games
Southeast Asian Games medalists in swimming
Southeast Asian Games silver medalists for Singapore
Southeast Asian Games gold medalists for Singapore
Competitors at the 1965 Southeast Asian Peninsular Games
Competitors at the 1967 Southeast Asian Peninsular Games
Competitors at the 1969 Southeast Asian Peninsular Games
Competitors at the 1971 Southeast Asian Peninsular Games
20th-century Singaporean women